The men's sprint cycling event at the 1988 Summer Olympics took place from 21 to 24 September and was one of the nine cycling events at the 1988 Olympics. There were 25 competitors from 25 nations. After the 1984 Games had featured a humongously bloated 34-cyclist, 11-round, 63-match competition, the competition size was cut down by restricting nations to one cyclist yet again (the rule in place from 1928 to 1956 and in 1976 and 1980) and instituting a qualifying round: this reduced the format to 25 cyclists, 8 rounds (including the qualifying round), and 29 matches (not included the time trials in the qualifying round). The event was won by Lutz Heßlich of East Germany, the 1980 gold medalist who was unable to compete in 1984 due to the Soviet-led boycott. Soviet cyclist Nikolai Kovsh took silver, the best result to date for the Soviets. Gary Neiwand of Australia earned bronze; for both the Soviets and Australians, it was the first medal in the event since 1972.

Background

This was the 19th appearance of the event, which has been held at every Summer Olympics except 1904 and 1912. None of the quarterfinalists from 1984 returned. The East German team was in the height of its dominance of the event, rising in the 1970s, peaking in the late 1980s, and continuing into the 1990s. The last nine medalists at the World Championships (gold, silver, and bronze in 1985, 1986, and 1987) had all been East German. Lutz Heßlich had won in 1985 and 1987 and finished second in 1986; he had also won the Olympic gold medal in 1980 (not competed in 1984 due to the Soviet-led boycott). When he was chosen to represent East Germany, he was an overwhelming favorite—everyone who had challenged him in the last few years was unable to compete due to the one-cyclist-per-nation rule that had been resurrected after the 1984 Games had allowed two per nation.

Bolivia and Ecuador each made their debut in the men's sprint. France made its 19th appearance, the only nation to have competed at every appearance of the event.

Competition format

This sprint competition involved a series of head-to-head matches along with the new qualifying round of time trials. There were five main match rounds, with two repechages. Only one-round repechages were used.

 Qualifying round: Each of the 25 competitors completed a 200 metre flying time trial (reaching full speed before timing started for the last 200 metres). The top 24 advanced to the match rounds, seeded based on their time in the qualifying round. With 25 riders starting, only the slowest cyclist was eliminated.
 Round 1: The 24 cyclists were seeded into 8 heats of 3 cyclists each. The winner of each heat advanced to the 1/8 finals (8 cyclists) while the other two cyclists went to the first repechage (16 cyclists).
 First repechage: The 16 cyclists were divided into 4 heats, each with 4 cyclists. The winner of each heat advanced to the 1/8 finals (4 cyclists), with all others eliminated (12 cyclists).
 1/8 finals: The 12 remaining cyclists competed in a 1/8 finals round. There were 4 heats in this round, with 3 cyclists in each. The top cyclist in each heat advanced to the quarterfinals (4 cyclists), while the remaining two in each heat went to the second repechage (8 cyclists).
 Second repechage: This round featured 4 heats, with 2 cyclists each. The winner of each heat advanced to the quarterfinals (4 cyclists); the losers were eliminated (4 cyclists).
 Quarterfinals: Beginning with the quarterfinals, all matches were one-on-one competitions and were held in best-of-three format. There were 4 quarterfinals, with the winner of each advancing to the semifinals and the loser going to the fifth-eighth classification race.
 Semifinals: The two semifinals provided for advancement to the gold medal final for winners and to the bronze medal final for losers.
 Finals: Both a gold medal final and a bronze medal final were held, as well as a classification final for fifth through eighth places for quarterfinal losers.

Records

The records for the sprint are 200 metre flying time trial records, kept for the qualifying round in later Games as well as for the finish of races.

Lutz Heßlich set a new record with 10.395 seconds in the qualifying round.

Schedule

All times are Korea Standard Time adjusted for daylight savings (UTC+10)

Results

Qualifying round

Round 1

Heat 1

Heat 2

Heat 3

Heat 4

Heat 5

Heat 6

Heat 7

Heat 8

First repêchage

First repechage heat 1

First repechage heat 2

First repechage heat 3

First repechage heat 4

1/8 finals

1/8 final 1

1/8 final 2

1/8 final 3

1/8 final 4

Second repêchage

Second repechage heat 1

Second repechage heat 2

Second repechage heat 3

Second repechage heat 4

Quarterfinals

Quarterfinal 1

Quarterfinal 2

Quarterfinal 3

Quarterfinal 4

Semifinals

Semifinal 1

Semifinal 2

Finals

Classification 5–8

Bronze medal match

Final

References

Cycling at the Summer Olympics – Men's sprint
Track cycling at the 1988 Summer Olympics
Men's events at the 1988 Summer Olympics